Nicochares (died ca. 345 BC) was an Athenian poet of the Old Comedy, son of the comic playwright Philonides and contemporary with Aristophanes. The titles of  Nicochares' plays, as enumerated by Suidas, are, Αμυμώνη (Amymone), Πέλοψ (Pelops), Γαλάτεια (Galatea), Ηρακλής Γάμων (Hercules Getting Married), Ηρακλής Χορηγός (Hercules the Play-Producer), Κρήτες (Cretans), Λάκωνες (The Laconians), Λημνίαι (Lemnian Women), Κένταυροι (Centaurs), and Χειρογάστορες (Those Living Hand-to-Mouth). Augustus Meineke suggested that the Amymone and Pelops may have been alternative names for the same work, as the Suda lists the two works together when all of the others are in alphabetical order, and a fragment of Amymone quoted by Athenaeus mentions Oenomaus, the father-in-law of Pelops.

From the extant fragments of Nicochares' work, one can only infer that he treated in the style of the Old Comedy—occasionally rising into tragic dignity. It is also evident that his comedies were influenced by the legends and local traditions of his country, and, undoubtedly, served to ridicule the peculiarities of the neighboring states.

References

Ancient Greek dramatists and playwrights
4th-century BC Athenians
4th-century BC writers
Old Comic poets
Year of birth unknown
340s BC deaths